Cara Black and Aleksandra Olsza defeated Trudi Musgrave and Jodi Richardson in the final, 6–0, 7–6(7–5) to win the girls' doubles tennis title at the 1995 Wimbledon Championships.

Seeds

  Corina Morariu /  Ludmila Varmužová (semifinals)
  Olga Barabanschikova /  Alice Canepa (second round)
  Cara Black /  Aleksandra Olsza (champions)
  Trudi Musgrave /  Jodi Richardson (final)
  Siobhan Drake-Brockman /  Annabel Ellwood (quarterfinals)
 n/a
  Déborah Gaviria /  Paula Hermida (first round)
  Amélie Cocheteux /  Amélie Mauresmo (quarterfinals)

Draw

Finals

Top half

Bottom half

References

External links

Girls' Doubles
Wimbledon Championship by year – Girls' doubles